Percy William Selby Belvin (born 26 December 1912, date of death unknown) was a Bermudian swimmer. He competed in the men's 200 metre breaststroke at the 1936 Summer Olympics.

References

External links
 

1912 births
Year of death missing
Bermudian male swimmers
Olympic swimmers of Bermuda
Swimmers at the 1936 Summer Olympics
Commonwealth Games competitors for Bermuda
Swimmers at the 1938 British Empire Games
People from Hamilton Parish
Male breaststroke swimmers